One Way Ticket is an Indian Marathi language film directed by Kamal Nathani and Amol Shetge. The film stars Sachit Patil, Amruta Khanvilkar, Gashmeer Mahajani, Neha Mahajan and Shashank Ketkar (in his film debut). Music by Gaurav Dagoankar. The film was released on 23 September 2016 and was successful at the box-office.

Synopsis 
Aniket boards a cruise ship using Aditya's passport after he stumbles upon it accidentally. However, Aniket finds out that Shivani, Aditya's girlfriend, is on the cruise and may blow his cover.

Cast 
 Sachit Patil as Samar Raj
 Amruta Khanvilkar as Shivani
 Gashmeer Mahajani as Adiatya Rane
 Shashank Ketkar as Aniket
 Neha Mahajan as Urvashi Pradhan
 Aasha Shelar as Aniket's mother
 Rishi Deshpande as Shivani’s father
 Roger D'costa

Production 
Shooting began on 21 September 2015. The film was shot in 4 different countries in Europe.

Soundtrack

The soungs are composed by Gaurav Dagaonkar and background score is given by Troy Arif.

Critical response 
One Way Ticket film received mixed reviews from critics. Mihir Bhanage of The Times of India gave the film a rating of 2/5 and wrote "OWT could’ve been a very good thriller had more focus been given to developing the script and story instead of innumerable aerial shots of the cruise ship, random songs on the streets of European nations and well, the ‘in-built’ talcum powder ad". Ganesh Matkari of Pune Mirror wrote "If we want to see another country, or go on a cruise, we would be buying a different ticket".In a 93-minute film, one expects a compact screenplay that would keep us occupied in the flow of events. Here, songs and sightseeing take over the film and let the suspense take a back seat". A reviewer from Zee News gave the film a rating of 2.5/5 and wrote "One Way Ticket is a grand film.  locations and new actors add to the value of cinema". A reviewer from Loksatta wrote "More than a mystery film, Ponds promotion can be a feature of this film. The highly anticipated film is a huge disappointment". Soumitra Pote of Maharashtra Times gave the film 2 stars out of 5 and wrote "The length of the movie is only 93 minutes. If you are a fan of these actors, then watch this movie".

References

External links
 
 

2016 films
2010s Marathi-language films
Indian drama films